Deparia acrostichoides, commonly called silvery glade fern or silvery spleenwort, is a perennial species of fern. Its range include much of the eastern United States and Canada, from Ontario to Nova Scotia, and Georgia to Louisiana and eastern Asia in China, Russia, Japan and Korea. The name silvery comes from the fact that the indusia on the underside of the leaf have a silver color when the sori are close to ripening.

Description
Silvery spleenwort has pinnately divided yellowish green leaves arising from a stout, green, slightly brown hairy and scaly stem.  The stem is typically grooved on the upper side, much shorter than the leaf blade and darker colored near its base, being dark red or brown, as the stem reaches the leaflets it becomes a pale green color. The leaves are broadest in the middle with a long pointed tip and tapering base with the lowest pair of leaflets generally pointing downward. The tapering and downward pointed bottom leaves are a diagnostic characteristic for helping to distinguish this fern from similar ferns.

The leaves are 30–80 cm long and 10–25 cm in width, their underside is covered in fuzzy yellow-green hairs. There are approximately 18 leaflets on a leaf, these are approximately 15 cm long and 1 cm wide and relatively straight. The leaflets are themselves cut into oblong subleaflets which may have a blunt or rounded tip. The sterile and fertile leaflets are similar in form. The fertile leaves bear sori on the underside of the leaves and are silvery green at first but later become light brown as they ripen. The sori are pinnately arranged on the subleafets in a pattern which follows the veination; they are typically straight or slightly curved with a thick indusia with an entire margin. The fertile pinnae can be described as acrostichoid as the sporangia covers almost the entirety of the underside of the leaf surface. Acrostichoid is also the term from which D. acrostichoides derives its species name.

It often forms extensive colonies, growing from creeping roots. Silvery spleenwort is a common fern in stream bottoms, moist woods, and cool shaded areas throughout its range.

Gallery

References

Athyriaceae
Ferns of the United States
Flora of Asia
Plants described in 1803